Mäemurati is a settlement in Haanja Parish, Võru County in southeastern Estonia.

References

Villages in Võru County